Huckhoe Settlement is an archaeological site in Northumberland, England, near the village of Bolam and about  west of Morpeth. The site shows occupation, in at least four phases, dating from the early Iron Age (6th century BC) to the post-Roman period (6th century AD). It is a scheduled monument.

Description
The site is on an oval promontory, steep on the north and west sides, above a tributary of the River Wansbeck. This is thought to be a re-occupation in the Romano-British period, of an Iron Age defended settlement.

Excavation
There was excavation from 1955 to 1957. Traces of a palisaded enclosure were uncovered, consisting of three concentric palisades of oak.  A sample was radio-carbon dated to about 580 BC: the early Iron Age. Similar palisaded hilltop enclosures have been found in north-east England and southern Scotland; they are the earliest type of defended settlement in the area. They indicate that there was much woodland here at that time.

The excavation also found that it was probably an iron-working site during the Romano-British period, as iron slag and a probable iron-worker's hearth were found. There were also remains of rectangular buildings, interpreted as dating from the post-Roman period.

Finds from the excavation included sherds of Romano-British pottery of the 2nd to 4th century, and sherds dating to the late 5th or early 6th century.

Archaeological sites nearby
 The Poind and his Man, a Bronze Age burial mound
 Shaftoe Crags Settlement, a Romano-British defended settlement
 Slate Hill Settlement, an Iron Age defended settlement

References

Scheduled monuments in Northumberland
Archaeological sites in Northumberland
Belsay